Płaczkowo  is a village in the administrative district of Gmina Jutrosin, within Rawicz County, Greater Poland Voivodeship, in west-central Poland.

References

Villages in Rawicz County